The 2022 Scottish Women's Cup Final was the 51st  final of the Scottish Women’s Cup the most prestigious knockout football competition in Scotland. The match was played on 29 May 2022 at Tynecastle Park, Edinburgh Scotland. It was the 51st final which was first held in 1971. Celtic and Glasgow City were the finalists which was the first time they had faced each other in the final. The match was televised live in the United Kingdom on the free-to-air channel BBC Alba and radio coverage was provided by BBC Sport Scotland,
Celtic won the trophy, with Fran Alonso becoming the first Spanish-born manager to win the Scottish Women's Cup

Route to the final
2021-22 Scottish Woman's Cup

Glasgow City

Being from the Premier League, Glasgow City entered the tournament in the third round and had the home advantage when they defeated Queen's Park at  Petershill Park.
|In the fourth round, they again had a home advantage when they faced Hamilton Academical. In the quarter-final, they travelled to face Stirling University. Falkirk Stadium was the neutral venue for the Semi Final where they faced Partick Thistle  defeating them 0-2.

Celtic

Being from the Scottish Women's Premier League, Celtic entered the tournament in the third round where they defeated Edinburgh City away from home at Forester’s Park, Tranent. In the fourth round, they were the home team that defeated Rangers. In the Quarter Final, they were the visitors at Balmoral Stadium facing Aberdeen. In the Semi-Final, the game was played at neutral venue Falkirk Stadium where they were pitted against  Heart of Midlothian.

Pre-match
Going into 2022 final, Glasgow City had won the Scottish Cup 9 times from 13 appearances in the final. The 2022 final was Celtic's second appearance in the final since 2008 which they had lost to Hibernian.

Match

Details

References 

2021 in women's association football
2022 in women's association football
Scottish Women's Cup